The office of the President of the University of Houston, currently held by Renu Khator, was created with the founding of the University of Houston (then known as Houston Junior College) in 1927 as the chief executive officer of the school. From 1927 until 1945 when UH separated from Houston Independent School District, the university's president also held the position of Superintendent of Schools of that school district. In 1956, the duties of president were divided into two positions. The position of Chancellor was created to fulfill past presidential duties regarding external affairs, while the president remained responsible for internal affairs of the university. This leadership structure lasted until 1961, when the university became a state-run, public institution. The duties of the chancellor and president became re-consolidated back into the sole position of president.

Since 1997, the President of the University of Houston has also held the position of Chancellor of the University of Houston System, thus making it a dual-office. Note: The defunct Chancellor of the University of Houston position should not be confused with the current position of Chancellor of the University of Houston System. While one position refers to a leader of the single flagship institution of the University of Houston System, the latter refers to the leader of the entire University of Houston System consisting of several other universities besides the flagship institution.

 
Houston
Presidents of the University of Houston